Sahara Sunday Spain is an emerging writer born in California in 1991.

Her mother is the contemporary artist-photographer Elisabeth Sunday and her father, Johnny Spain, is a former Black Panther and convicted murderer. Spain published her first book with HarperSanFrancisco when she was only 9 years old, becoming one of America's youngest published authors to have a monograph. The book contains 61 poems illustrated with her drawings made between the ages of 5 and 8 years old.

Spain was featured in a variety of international news media including: The Early Show with Bryant Gumble, The PBS affiliate KQED's Spark, To Tell the Truth, and the French station TF1, Drôle de petits champions. She was also featured in The New York Times Magazine, The Guardian, the San Francisco Chronicle, The Oakland Tribune, Time for Kids and the May 28, 2001 issue of the French magazine OH LA!

Published books
 If There Would Be No Light: Poems From My Heart (Hardcover) 2001

External links
  Sahara Sunday Spain's website
  Crítica en un artículo de El País
   KQED Spark Video
  Guardian
  NYT Magazine
  Time for Kids
  SF Chronicle
  Elisabeth Sunday's website
  Esquire Magazine, Johnny Spain

References

1991 births
Living people
African-American poets
21st-century American poets
Poets from California
American women poets
21st-century American women writers
21st-century African-American women writers
21st-century African-American writers